James Norvell may refer to:

Jay Norvell (Merritt James Norvell III, born 1963), American football coach and former player
James R. Norvell (1902–1969), Justice of the Supreme Court of Texas
Aubrey James Norvell, sniper who shot civil rights activist James Meredith